The 1964–65 Taça de Portugal was the 25th edition of the Portuguese football knockout tournament, organized by the Portuguese Football Federation (FPF). The 1964–65 Taça de Portugal began in September 1964. The final was played on 4 July 1965 at the Estádio Nacional.

Benfica were the previous holders, having defeated Porto 6–2 in the previous season's final. Defending champions Benfica reached the final but were unable to regain the Taça de Portugal as Vitória de Setúbal defeated the Encarnados 3–1 to claim their first Taça de Portugal.

First round
Teams from the Primeira Liga (I) and the Portuguese Second Division (II) entered at this stage. Each side would contest a second round place by playing two matches: one home and one away match. In case the aggregate score after the two games was level, the cup tie would be replayed.

|}

Second round
Due to the odd number of teams involved at this stage of the competition, Oriental qualified for the next round due to having no opponent to face at this stage of the competition.

|}

Third round
Due to the odd number of teams involved at this stage of the competition, Belenenses qualified for the next round due to having no opponent to face at this stage of the competition. Micaelense, Sports Angola, União da Madeira and União de Bissau were invited to participate in the competition.

|}

Quarter-finals

|}

Semi-finals

|}

Final

References

Taça de Portugal seasons
1964–65 domestic association football cups
Taca